= Peabody Park =

Park in Memphis, Tennessee, United States

Coordinates: 35°07′36″N 89°59′31″W

Peabody Park is a park run by the city of Memphis that offers a playground, aqua play (summer), and the Raymond Skinner Center. The address of the Raymond Skinner Center is listed as 712 Tanglewood, but the park sits just behind the facility and is bordered by the streets Cooper and Higbee.
